Ahmed Ghazi Abdel-Hafeeth Hatamleh commonly known as Ahmed Ghazi (born 10 July 1982) is a retired Jordanian footballer who played mostly for Al-Hussein as a midfielder.

References

External links
Player Info at Goalzz.com

1982 births
Living people
Jordanian footballers
Jordan international footballers
Jordanian expatriate footballers
Association football midfielders
Al-Ramtha SC players
Al-Hussein SC (Irbid) players
Al-Baqa'a Club players
Al-Yarmouk FC (Jordan) players
Al-Arabi (Jordan) players
Al-Shabab SC (Seeb) players
Al-Nahda Club (Oman) players
Expatriate footballers in Oman
Jordanian expatriate sportspeople in Oman
Jordanian Pro League players
Oman Professional League players